Birchwood High School is a coeducational secondary school and sixth form with academy status located in Bishop's Stortford, Hertfordshire, England.

The school was converted to academy status in February 2012. It used to be a community school under the direct control of Hertfordshire County Council. The school continues to coordinate with the council for admissions.

Birchwood High School offers General Certificate of Secondary Education (GCSEs) and Business and Technology Education Council (BTECs) as courses of study for pupils, with A Levels offered in the sixth form.

The school has been recognised by The Good Schools Guide for the standard of its maths education in 2009, 2011 and 2012.

History 
Birchwood High School was founded when Hadham Hall and The Margaret Dane schools merged in 1991 and the name Birchwood High School was voted for by students from both schools and opened with approximately 450 students; it now has around 1500.  The school became an Academy in 2012 and is part of the Bishop's Stortford Educational Trust working with other secondary schools and local primaries to sponsor new schools in the Bishop's Stortford North Development.

Birchwood High School celebrated their twenty fifth anniversary in 2016.

Notable former pupils
Ashley Sutton, racing driver

References

External links
Birchwood High School official website

Secondary schools in Hertfordshire
Academies in Hertfordshire
Bishop's Stortford
Educational institutions established in 1991
1991 establishments in England